The 1937 Idaho Vandals football team represented the University of Idaho in the 1937 college football season. The Vandals were led by third-year head coach Ted Bank, and were members of the Pacific Coast Conference. Home games were played on campus in Moscow at the new Neale Stadium, with one in Boise at Public School Field.

Season
The recently completed Neale Stadium hosted an upset homecoming win over favored Oregon State, the first of four straight wins to open the venue.

In the Battle of the Palouse with neighbor Washington State, the Vandals suffered a tenth straight loss, falling  in the rain in Pullman on October 2. Idaho's most recent win in the series was a dozen years earlier in 1925 and the next was seventeen years away, in 1954.

The Vandals finished the season with a pair of 6–0 shutout victories over Gonzaga in Spokane, and Montana in Moscow. It was the only loss of the year for the Grizzlies and their only conference game scheduled. The team recorded four shutouts and yielded only 53 points in eight games, but tallied only 35 and went scoreless three times.

The winning season was the first for Idaho football in a decade and it was followed up with a better record in 1938. Future coaches among the Vandal players included Tony Knap, Lyle Smith, and Steve Belko.

Schedule

 The Little Brown Stein trophy for the Montana game debuted the next year in 1938
 One game was played on Friday (St. Mary's at San Francisco)

All-conference
No Vandals were named to the All-Coast team; honorable mention were end Tony Knap, tackle George Thiessen, and guard Walter Musial.

References

External links
Gem of the Mountains: 1938 University of Idaho yearbook – 1937 football season
Go Mighty Vandals – 1937 football season
Official game program: Idaho at Washington State –  October 2, 1937
WSU Libraries: Game video – Idaho at Washington State – October 2, 1937
Idaho Argonaut – student newspaper – 1937 editions

Idaho
Idaho Vandals football seasons
Idaho Vandals football